The Gospel of Perfection is a lost text from the New Testament apocrypha. The text is mentioned in ancient anti-heretical works by the church fathers. It is thought to be a gnostic text of the Ophites, and is believed by some to be the same as the Gospel of Eve, though the words of Saint Epiphanius implied that they were separate Gospels. Some others also believe that it was the same as the Gospel of Philip. In regards to the Gospel, Epiphanius stated, 

The Gospel of Perfection is also briefly discussed in the Gospel of the Infancy where, after a "lengthy account  of the miracles performed by Christ while a child in Egypt", it states,

In mystery religions, the term perfect had a special meaning, namely that someone who was a perfect had achieved total enlightenment. This is similar in some ways to the concept of achieving Nirvana within Buddhism.

See also
List of Gospels

References

Perfection